ε-Caprolactone or simply caprolactone is a lactone (a cyclic ester) possessing a seven-membered ring. Its name is derived from caproic acid. This colorless liquid is miscible with most organic solvents and water.  It was once produced on a large scale as a precursor to caprolactam.

Production and uses
Caprolactone is prepared industrially by Baeyer-Villiger oxidation of cyclohexanone with peracetic acid.

Caprolactone is a monomer used in the production of highly specialised polymers. Ring-opening polymerization, for example, gives polycaprolactone. Another polymer is polyglecaprone, used as suture material in surgery.

Reactions
Although no longer economical, caprolactone was once produced as a precursor to caprolactam. Caprolactone is treated with ammonia at elevated temperatures to give the lactam:
(CH2)5CO2 + NH3 → (CH2)5C(O)NH + H2O

Carbonylation of caprolactone gives, after hydrolysis, pimelic acid. The lactone ring is easily opened with nucleophiles including alcohols and water to give polylactones and eventually the 6-hydroxyadipic acid.

Related compounds  
Several other caprolactones are known. These isomers include α-, β-, γ-, and δ-caprolactones. All are chiral. (R)-γ-caprolactone is a component of floral scents and of the aromas of some fruits and vegetables, and is also produced by the Khapra beetle as a pheromone. δ-caprolactone is found in heated milk fat.

An ether of caprolactone is used as a binder for AP/AN/Al rocket propellant HTCE: Hydroxy-Terminated Caprolactone Ether

Safety
Caprolactone hydrolyses rapidly and the resulting hydroxycarboxylic acid displays unexceptional toxicity, as is common for the other hydroxycarboxylic acids. It is known to cause severe eye irritation. Exposure may result in corneal injury.

References 

Epsilon-lactones
Monomers
Oxepanes